South Perth  may refer to:

Australia
 City of South Perth, local government area
 Electoral district of South Perth, electoral district
 South Perth, Western Australia, suburb of Perth

Canada
 Perth South, electoral district
 Perth South, Ontario

United Kingdom
 the southern part of Perth and Kinross in Scotland